Abertura Photovoltaic Power Station is a photovoltaic power station in the municipality of Abertura, Cáceres in Spain. It has a total capacity of 23.1 MWp.  The solar park was built by Iberinco. Double axes solar trackers were provided by Mecasolar and Inspira. The financing consortium was led by West LB, Bank of Scotland and Dexia. A technical advisor was Sylcom Solar.

See also 

 Photovoltaic power stations

References 

Photovoltaic power stations in Spain
Energy in Extremadura